American singer Selena released twenty-four official singles, seven promotional singles. Her career began as the lead vocalist of Los Dinos in 1980. Her albums with Los Dinos on indie labels failed to achieve any chart success. In 1987, her remake of Ritchie Valens' "La Bamba" peaked at number 19 on the United States Billboard Hot Latin Songs chart, her first entry. She signed with EMI Latin nine years later as a solo artist though her band continued to tour with her. Selena appeared on "Buenos Amigos" with Salvadoran singer Álvaro Torres. The track peaked at number one on the U.S. Hot Latin Songs chart in 1991, the singer's first number one song. Subsequent singles, "Baila Esta Cumbia" and "Como la Flor", became popular songs on Mexican radio, with "Como la Flor" launching the singer's career in that country. "Como la Flor" peaked at number six on the Hot Latin Songs chart, despite popular culture claims that it was the singer's first number one single. The track has charted on the U.S. Regional Mexican Digital Songs list since its inception in 2010 and remains the singer's signature number and most popular recording.

Selena's first live album, Live (1993), contained three studio tracks and produced two top-five U.S. singles, "No Debes Jugar" and "La Llamada". After her collaboration with the Barrio Boyzz on the single "Donde Quiera Que Estés" peaked at number one on the Hot Latin Songs chart, Selena released her fourth studio album, Amor Prohibido (1994). The album continued the singer's streak of US number one singles with "Amor Prohibido", "Bidi Bidi Bom Bom", "No Me Queda Más", and The Pretenders' cover "Fotos y Recuerdos". The latter peaked at number one posthumously following the shooting death of Selena on March 31, 1995. "Amor Prohibido" and "No Me Queda Más" became the most successful U.S. Latin singles of 1994 and 1995, respectively. At the time of her death, Selena was in the process of crossing over into the American pop market. Recording labels EMI Latin and EMI Records jointly released Dreaming of You several months after her death. Fearful that the song might cannibalize sales of the album in the U.S., EMI Records released "I Could Fall in Love" as a promotional single. It became the highest charting English-language song on the Hot Latin Songs chart for two years and became her first number one single in Canada. The title track, "Dreaming of You" became the highest charting Billboard Hot 100 song of the singer's career, peaking at number 22. Her cover of Pedro Infante's "Tú Sólo Tú" peaked at number one on the Hot Latin Songs for ten consecutive weeks; the longest number-one single of her career. "I'm Getting Used to You" peaked at number one on the U.S. Dance/Electronic Singles Sales; her first number one on that chart.

Selena's last recorded song, "A Boy Like That" (a song from the 1967 musical West Side Story) was part of the National Academy of Recording Arts and Sciences honoring the musical. The song was also a benefit recording for AIDS Project Los Angeles. It peaked at number four on the U.S. Dance Club Songs chart after its release in 1996. In 2002, Selena's brother and music producer A.B. Quintanilla mashed "Como la Flor", "Amor Prohibido", and "Si Una Vez" into a medley entitled "Con Tanto Amor Medley" to promote the album Ones. Since Billboard magazine began monitoring music downloads in 2010, Selena's songs re-entered the U.S. charts including first time entries "La Carcacha" (1990), "Ya Ves" (1990), "Enamorada de Ti" (1990), "Baila Esta Cumbia" (1992), and "El Chico del Apartamento 512" (1994).

Singles

Solo career

Selena y Los Dinos singles

Promotional singles and other charted songs

Other appearances

See also 
Billboard Top Latin Songs Year-End Chart
List of songs recorded by Selena
Selena albums discography
Selena videography

Notes

References

Sources

External links 
 

 
Latin pop music discographies
Regional Mexican music discographies
Discographies of American artists